Jean-Jacques Champin  (8 September 1796, Sceaux - 25 February 1860, Paris) was a French painter, watercolorist and lithographer.

Biography 
He was also an admirer of Jean-Jacques Rousseau; hence his son's name. In addition to his father, he studied with Félix Storelli (1778-1854) and Jacques Auguste Regnier.
 
He married Céleste Biolay, with whom he had three children. Her delicate health forced them to live in Bourgogne until they moved in Paris in 1815. At that time, he became interested in what was then the new process of lithography. His first work in that medium was a view of the church in Sceaux.

He focused on historical landscapes, however and, to this end, took numerous trips to the Chartreuse Mountains (1823), the Pyrénées (1825) and Italy (1830). Together with Regnier, he created '' Picturesque views of the main castles and pleasure houses around Paris and the departments (1826), the Habitations of the most famous personages of France since 1790 until our day (1831-1835) and The Seine and its Surroundings (1836) and Historical Paris: Walks through the Streets of Paris (three volumes, 1838).

During this period, he was introduced to the literary salon at the Bibliothèque de l'Arsenal, where he became friends with many leading artists and writers; including David d'Angers, who would create a medal with his profile, and Charles Nodier, who wrote the preface to Habitations....

In 1835 Céleste died. Two years later, he married Élisa Honorine Petiet, a watercolorist and lithographer who specialized in floral still-lifes, and they had a daughter in 1840. He also provided illustrations for publications such as Le Magasin pittoresque and L'Illustration. During the 1850s, he produced some religious scenes.

His works may be seen at the Fogg Art Museum, Metropolitan Museum of Art, Musée Dauphinois, Musée d'art et d'histoire de Meudon, Musée Carnavalet and the Louvre, among many others.

References

Further reading 
 Pierre Hainglaise and François Boucher, Jean-Jacques Champin, dessinateur, peintre, lithographe (1796-1860), Imprimerie de la Haute-Loire, 1937.
 Pierre Hainglaise and François Boucher, "Jean-Jacques Champin", in: Bulletin des amis de Sceaux, 1937, pp. 31–82.

External links 

 More works by Champin @ ArtNet

1796 births
1860 deaths
People from Sceaux, Hauts-de-Seine
19th-century French painters
French male painters
French watercolourists
French lithographers
19th-century French male artists